Because I Said So may refer to:

Because I Said So (film), a 2007 film starring Mandy Moore and Diane Keaton
Because I Said So (TV series), a 2002 talk show

See also
 Ipse dixit - A bare assertion, such as "Believe it because I said so."